Up Late with Rylan is a British late night chat show presented by Rylan Clark-Neal. The show premiered on Channel 5 on 9 May 2016. Due to the poor ratings and a negative reception, the show was not renewed for a second series.

Format
Rylan Clark-Neal hosts a lively, interactive late night chat-show featuring guests, gossip, music and games.

Recurring sketches/segments
 McCann or McCann't – Ferne McCann
 Turner's Top Tips – Anthea Turner
 Sophie's Choice – Sophie Willan
 Rylan Relief – Rylan Clark-Neal

Games

Back Catalogue Bingo
In this game Rylan sends celebrities to a phone to phone a business and use as many words related to the celebrity as they can in 90 Seconds.

Bank or Bin
Each week, a member of the public is given 6 singletons, which they must cut down to 2. Based on the gifts they bring, they must then decide who they would like to take on a date. On the following night's episode, the couple return and reveal if they want to go on a second date.

Episodes

Series 1

References

External links
Up Late With Rylan at Channel5.com

2016 British television series debuts
2016 British television series endings
Channel 5 (British TV channel) original programming
Television series by Endemol
English-language television shows